was a Japanese jazz trumpeter and flugelhornist.

Oki was born in Kobe. He began studying koto as a child, under instruction from his mother, who was a professional kotoist. He took up trumpet from 1955 and played in high school bands, then enrolled at Osaka Industrial University, where he majored in architecture and concurrently played in Dixieland jazz ensembles.

Early in his career, Oki studied under Fumio Nanri, Kenny Dorham, and Sadao Watanabe, and in the 1960s and 1970s played with Nobusuke Miyamoto, Yoku Tamura, Kosuke Mine, and Akio Nishimura. In 1966, he was a cofounder of ESSG, along with Masahiko Sato, Mototeru Takagi, and Masahiko Togashi.

In 1974, Oki relocated to Paris, where he played with Japanese expat Takashi Kako and played across Europe with Art Farmer, Maynard Ferguson, Noah Howard, Lee Konitz, Steve Lacy, Michel Pilz, and Sam Rivers.

In 1992 he became a member of the World Residents ensemble.
He started to work since 2015, in Paris with pianist François Tusques, accordion player Claude Parle & Isabel Juan Pera singer.
The French label "Improvising Beings" has edited a CD: "Le chant du Jubjub" It's a reference to Lewis Carroll. Écouter Tchangodeï  itaru oki,  Kent carter trio : jeux d’ombres, perfect emptiness, jazz à vienne

References
Kazunori Sugiyama and Barry Kernfeld, "Itaru Oki". The New Grove Dictionary of Jazz, 2nd edn.

Japanese jazz trumpeters
Musicians from Kobe
21st-century trumpeters
1941 births
2020 deaths
NoBusiness Records artists